Francisco Sepúlveda may refer to:
 Francisco Xavier Sepúlveda (1747–1788), Mexican colonial military officer and founder of the Sepúlveda family of California
 Francisco Sepúlveda II (1775–1853), his son
 Francisco Sepúlveda (footballer), Chilean footballer

See also
 Sepúlveda family of California